Red Forest is a 1999 novel by Nobel prize-winning author Mo Yan.

1999 Chinese novels
Novels by Mo Yan